This is a list of electoral divisions and wards in the ceremonial county of North Yorkshire in Yorkshire and the Humber. All changes since the re-organisation of local government following the passing of the Local Government Act 1972 are shown. The number of councillors elected for each electoral division or ward is shown in brackets.

Unitary authority councils

Middlesbrough

Wards from 1 April 1974 (first election 7 June 1973) to 3 May 1979:

Wards from 3 May 1979 to 1 May 2003:

Wards from 1 May 2003 to 7 May 2015:

Wards from 7 May 2015 to present:

North Yorkshire

Electoral Divisions from 1 April 2023 (first election 5 May 2022):

Redcar and Cleveland

Wards from 1 April 1974 (first election 7 June 1973) to 6 May 1976:

Wards from 6 May 1976 to 2 May 1991:

Wards from 2 May 1991 to 1 May 2003:

Wards from 1 May 2003 to 2 May 2019:

Wards from 2 May 2019 to present:

Stockton-on-Tees
See: List of electoral wards in County Durham#Stockton-on-Tees

York

Wards from 1 April 1974 (first election 7 June 1973) to 3 May 1979:

Wards from 3 May 1979 to 4 May 1995:

Wards from 4 May 1995 to 1 May 2003:

Wards from 1 May 2003 to 7 May 2015:

Wards from 7 May 2015 to present:

Former county councils

Cleveland

Electoral Divisions from 1 April 1974 (first election 12 April 1973) to 2 May 1985:

Electoral Divisions from 2 May 1985 to 1 April 1996 (county abolished):

North Yorkshire

Electoral Divisions from 1 April 1974 (first election 12 April 1973) to 2 May 1985:

Electoral Divisions from 2 May 1985 to 5 May 2005:

Electoral Divisions from 5 May 2005 to 5 May 2022:

† minor boundary changes in 2013

Electoral Divisions from 6 May 2022 to 31 March 2023 (county abolished):

The electoral divisions for the election held on 5 May 2022 are those determined for the unitary North Yorkshire Council, and are in effect until the county council is abolished.

Former district councils

Craven

Wards from 1 April 1974 (first election 7 June 1973) to 3 May 1979:

Wards from 3 May 1979 to 2 May 2002:

Wards from 2 May 2002 to 1 April 2023:

† minor boundary changes in 2015legislation.gov.uk - The District of Craven (Electoral Changes) (Amendment) Order 2013. Retrieved on 3 November 2015.

Hambleton

Wards from 1 April 1974 (first election 7 June 1973) to 3 May 1979:

Wards from 3 May 1979 to 1 May 2003:

Wards from 1 May 2003 to 7 May 2015:

Wards from 7 May 2015 to 1 April 2023:

Harrogate

Wards from 1 April 1974 (first election 7 June 1973) to 5 May 1983:

Wards from 5 May 1983 to 2 May 2002:

Wards from 2 May 2002 to 3 May 2018:

Wards from 3 May 2018 to 1 April 2023:

Richmondshire

Wards from 1 April 1974 (first election 7 June 1973) to 3 May 1979:

Wards from 3 May 1979 to 1 May 2003:

Wards from 1 May 2003 to 2 May 2019:

Wards from 2 May 2019 to 1 April 2023:

Ryedale

Wards from 1 April 1974 (first election 7 June 1973) to 5 May 1983:

Wards from 5 May 1983 to 1 May 2003:

Wards from 1 May 2003 to 1 April 2023:

Scarborough

Wards from 1 April 1974 (first election 7 June 1973) to 3 May 1979:

Wards from 3 May 1979 to 1 May 2003:

Wards from 1 May 2003 to 2 May 2019:

Wards from 2 May 2019 to 1 April 2023:

Selby

Wards from 1 April 1974 (first election 7 June 1973) to 3 May 1979:

Wards from 3 May 1979 to 1 May 2003:

Wards from 1 May 2003 to 7 May 2015:

Wards from 7 May 2015 to 1 April 2023:

Electoral wards by constituency

Harrogate and Knaresborough
Bilton, Boroughbridge, Claro, Granby, Harlow Moor, High Harrogate, Hookstone, Killinghall, Knaresborough East, Knaresborough King James, Knaresborough Scriven Park, Low Harrogate, New Park, Pannal, Rossett, Saltergate, Starbeck, Stray, Woodfield.

Middlesbrough
Acklam, Ayresome, Beckfield, Beechwood, Brookfield, Clairville, Gresham, Kader, Linthorpe, Middlehaven, North Ormesby and Brambles Farm, Pallister, Park, Thorntree, University.

Middlesbrough South and East Cleveland
Brotton, Coulby Newham, Guisborough, Hemlington, Hutton, Ladgate, Lockwood, Loftus, Marton, Marton West, Nunthorpe, Park End, Saltburn, Skelton, Stainton and Thornton, Westworth.

Redcar
Coatham, Dormanstown, Eston, Grangetown, Kirkleatham, Longbeck, Newcomen, Normanby, Ormesby, St Germain’s, South Bank, Teesville, West Dyke, Zetland.

Richmond
Addlebrough, Barton, Bedale, Bolton Castle, Brompton, Brompton-on-Swale and Scorton, Broughton and Greenhow, Catterick, Colburn, Cowtons, Crakehall, Croft, Great Ayton, Gilling West, Hawes and High Abbotside, Hipswell, Hornby Castle, Leeming, Leeming Bar, Leyburn, Lower Wensleydale, Melsonby, Middleham, Middleton Tyas, Morton-on-Swale, Newsham with Eppleby, Northallerton Broomfield, Northallerton Central, Northallerton North, Osmotherley, Penhill, Reeth and Arkengarthdale, Richmond Central, Richmond East, Richmond West, Romanby, Rudby, Scotton, Stokesley, Swaledale, Swainby, Tanfield.

Scarborough and Whitby
Castle, Cayton, Central, Danby, Derwent Valley, Eastfield, Esk Valley, Falsgrave Park, Fylingdales, Lindhead, Mayfield, Mulgrave, Newby, North Bay, Northstead, Ramshill, Scalby, Hackness and Staintondale, Seamer, Stepney, Streonshalh, Weaponness, Whitby West Cliff, Woodlands.

Selby and Ainsty
Appleton Roebuck, Barlby, Brayton, Camblesforth, Cawood with Wistow, Eggborough, Fairburn with Brotherton, Hambleton, Hemingbrough, Marston Moor, Monk Fryston and South Milford, North Duffield, Ouseburn, Ribston, Riccall with Escrick, Saxton and Ulleskelf, Selby North, Selby South, Selby West, Sherburn in Elmet, Spofforth with Lower Wharfedale, Tadcaster East, Tadcaster West, Whitley.

Skipton and Ripon
Aire Valley with Lothersdale, Barden Fell, Bentham, Bishop Monkton, Cowling, Embsay-with-Eastby, Gargrave and Malhamdale, Glusburn, Grassington, Hellifield and Long Preston, Ingleton and Clapham, Kirkby Malzeard, Lower Nidderdale, Mashamshire, Newby, Nidd Valley, Pateley Bridge, Penyghent, Ripon Minster, Ripon Moorside, Ripon Spa, Settle and Ribblebanks, Skipton East, Skipton North, Skipton South, Skipton West, Sutton-in-Craven, Upper Wharfedale, Washburn, Wathvale, West Craven.

Stockton South

Ingleby Barwick East, Ingleby Barwick West, Mandale and Victoria,  Stainsby Hill, Village, Yarm.

Thirsk and Malton
Amotherby, Ampleforth, Cropton, Dales, Derwent, Easingwold, Filey, Helmsley, Helperby, Hertford, Hovingham, Huby and Sutton, Kirkbymoorside, Malton, Norton East, Norton West, Pickering East, Pickering West, Rillington, Ryedale South West, Sherburn, Sheriff Hutton, Shipton, Sinnington, Sowerby, Stillington, Thirsk, Thornton Dale, Thorntons, Tollerton, Topcliffe, White Horse, Whitestonecliffe, Wolds.

York Central
Acomb, Clifton, Fishergate, Guildhall, Heworth, Holgate, Hull Road, Micklegate, Westfield.

York Outer
Bishopthorpe, Derwent, Dringhouses and Woodthorpe, Fulford, Haxby and Wigginton, Heslington, Heworth Without, Huntington and New Earswick, Osbaldwick, Rural West York, Skelton, Rawcliffe and Clifton Without, Strensall, Wheldrake.

See also
List of parliamentary constituencies in North Yorkshire

References

 
North Yorkshire
Wards